7 Days in Hell is a sports mockumentary directed by Jake Szymanski and written by Murray Miller. The film premiered on July 11, 2015, on HBO and July 8 on HBO Now.  The film was inspired by the Isner–Mahut marathon men's singles match at the 2010 Wimbledon Championships.

Plot
The film is framed as a fictitious HBO Sports documentary incorporating BBC footage. It explores the backgrounds of the competitors Aaron Williams (Andy Samberg) and Charles Poole (Kit Harington), two professional tennis players who face off in what becomes the longest match in history.

Aaron Williams is considered "The Bad Boy of Tennis." He is an American orphan who was found on the streets and adopted by Richard Williams, who raised Aaron with his daughters, Venus and Serena Williams. At the 1996 Wimbledon Men's Singles Final, his serve hits a line judge, who has an immediate heart attack and dies. Williams falters and loses the match. At the ceremony following the match, Williams pushes Prince Edward (Howie Mandel), and disappears.

Charles Poole is a British child prodigy, forced into a tennis career by his domineering mother (Mary Steenburgen), who threatens to disown him if he loses. He appears on a sports talk show hosted by Caspian Wint (Michael Sheen) as a 15 year old and is on track to become the youngest professional tennis player in history. He tells Wint that he idolizes Aaron Williams.

Williams resurfaces in Sweden creating a male underwear line, but the line is discontinued when it is found to cause groin chafing and infertility. When Williams runs out of funds, he descends into pornography and an addiction to PCP. He is arrested, convicted, and is sent to a Swedish prison.

Two weeks before the 2001 Wimbledon Championships starts, Poole is asked by a reporter if he is a better player than Williams, he says yes. This comment reaches Williams, who escapes prison and becomes a free man, according to Swedish law.

Williams claims he will be playing in Wimbledon. The All-England Chair Committee, led by the Duke of Kent, refuses to let him play. Edward Pudding (Fred Armisen), also a member of the committee, believes that letting Williams play will spike interest for the tournament, and he suggests that Williams play an Englishman who is likely to beat him, which turns out to be Poole.

The night before the match, Poole receives a call from Queen Elizabeth II (June Squibb), who tells him to "win."

On the first day of the match, Poole wins the first set 6–0. Before the second set starts, a thunderstorm suspends play for the rest of the day.

On the second day, a revitalized Williams takes the second and third sets under the influence of cocaine. That night, Poole gets another call from the Queen. She drunkenly shouts expletives, accuses him of embarrassing England and bribes him with a knighthood if he wins.

On the third day, neither Williams and Poole are willing to surrender the match. After eight hours of intense tennis, the match is suspended.

On the fourth day, a female streaker (Lyssa Roberts) runs onto the court. Williams tries to subdue her, but ends up having sex with her. After they finish, a male streaker (Chris Romano) runs onto the court, with whom Williams also has sex. The female streaker runs back onto the court, and a threesome takes place until the match is suspended on account of darkness.

Before the fifth day, Williams arranges a press conference to announce he has located his birth father, British singer Engelbert Humperdinck. He claims he will dedicate his performance at Wimbledon to all Englishmen. After darkness again suspends the match, Poole is physically attacked in an elevator by the Queen.

Before the sixth day, Williams is hit by a truck, which is implied to be driven by Poole. Williams leaves the hospital and elects to play with one arm. In the 196th game, with Poole serving 98-97 and triple match point, illusionist David Copperfield magically appears on Poole's shoulders. Copperfield later claims he was supposed to appear on the Statue of Liberty. Poole, visibly distracted, fails to win the match in the sixth day.

Before the seventh day, Poole and Williams meet at a joint press conference. Williams reveals that a sex tape of himself and Poole's ex-girlfriend Lily has been leaked, enraging Poole. Poole attacks Williams and removes his wig, revealing Williams's bald scalp.

The two elect to settle their matters on the court. Queen Elizabeth makes an appearance at the match, and the two players challenge each other to fight. Although the judges try to separate them, the Queen orders that they be released and allowed to fight. Poole and Williams charge the net and kill each other after simultaneously hitting one another in the head with their rackets. The two are buried together in the same coffin. The documentary ends with video flashbacks of Poole and Williams praising each other.

Cast
Andy Samberg as Aaron Williams
Kit Harington as Charles Poole
Mary Steenburgen as Louisa Poole, Charles' mother
Karen Gillan as Lily Allsworth, Charles' supermodel ex-girlfriend
Lena Dunham as Lanny Denver, former president of Jordache
Will Forte as Sandy Pickard, author of Aaron Williams: The Glorious Jester
June Squibb as Queen Elizabeth II
Michael Sheen as Caspian Wint, a British sports journalist and host of the sports talk show Good Sport
Fred Armisen as Edward Pudding, former president of the All England Club
Howie Mandel as Prince Edward, Duke of Kent
Jon Hamm as the narrator
Lyssa Roberts as a streaker
Chris Romano as a streaker
Also appearing as themselves are David Copperfield, Chris Evert, Filip Hammar, Jim Lampley, John McEnroe, Soledad O’Brien, and Serena Williams. Archive footage of Dolph Lundgren is also used with different subtitles to relate to the film's subject matter.

Broadcast
The American premiere on HBO on July 11, 2015, was watched by 579,000 viewers. In Australia, the telemovie premiered on August 8, 2015, on Showcase.

Critical reception
The film holds an approval rating of 86% based on 37 critics, and an average score of 7.6/10 on Rotten Tomatoes.

See also
Tour de Pharmacy

References

External links

2015 television films
2015 films
Tennis films
2010s mockumentary films
American mockumentary films
HBO Films films
Films set in 1995
Films set in 1996
Films set in 1997
Films set in 2001
Films set in London
Films set in Stockholm
Films set in Belgium
Cultural depictions of Elizabeth II
American short films
2015 short films
Films about cocaine
Films set in prison
Films about sportspeople
2010s American films